Kağan may refer to:
Khagan, a Turkic title
Kağan Söylemezgiller, Turkish footballer

Turkish masculine given names